Portugal was present at the Eurovision Song Contest 1985, held in Gothenburg, Sweden.

The Portuguese national final to select their entry, the Festival RTP da Canção 1985, was held on 7 March at the Coliseu dos Recreios in Lisbon, and was hosted by Margarida Andrade and Eládio Clímaco.

Eleven songs competed at the national final. The votes of national juries chose the winner.

The winning entry was "Penso em ti, eu sei", performed by Adelaide Ferreira, composed by Tozé Brito and written by Ferreira and Luís Fernando.

Before Eurovision

Festival da Canção 1985

At Eurovision
Adelaide Ferreira was the ninth performer on the night of the contest, following Belgium and preceding Germany. At Gothenburg, she was credited by only her first name. At the close of the voting the song had received 9 points, placing 18th in a field of 19 competing countries. It was the worst ranking Portugal had received since 1981.

Voting

References

External links
Portuguese National Final 1985

1985
Countries in the Eurovision Song Contest 1985
Eurovision